Gaywood is an upscale subdivision in the Memorial area in West Houston. The area is served by Rummel Creek Elementary, Memorial Middle School, and Stratford High School in the Spring Branch Independent School District.

The area, built in the 1950s–1970s like most Houston suburbs, has become a popular area for new development. Many houses on the Memorial Drive corridor are one story homes, but the neighborhood has seen a significant jump in two-story houses.

One of Gaywood's more prominent residents is David Morris, an attorney and LGBTQ activist.  News anchor, Dan Rather, and his family also lived in the neighborhood.

The neighborhood stretches from Memorial Drive southward to the Buffalo Bayou.

Neighborhoods in Houston
Geography of Harris County, Texas